USS Portsmouth was a  light cruiser of the United States Navy, which were built during World War II. The class was designed as a development of the earlier s, the size of which had been limited by the First London Naval Treaty. The start of the war led to the dissolution of the treaty system, but the dramatic need for new vessels precluded a new design, so the Clevelands used the same hull as their predecessors, but were significantly heavier. The Clevelands carried a main battery of twelve  guns in four three-gun turrets, along with a secondary armament of twelve  dual-purpose guns. Portsmouth was laid down in 1943, launched in September 1944, and commissioned in June 1945. By the time she completed her initial sea trials, the war had ended, so her career was short and uneventful. She made three overseas cruises to visit ports in Africa and the Mediterranean Sea between 1946 and 1948 before conducting training cruises later in 1948. The following year, she was decommissioned and assigned to the Atlantic Reserve Fleet, where she remained until 1970, when she was broken up.

Design

Following the start of World War II in September 1939, Britain announced it would suspend the treaty for the duration of the conflict, a decision the US Navy quickly followed. Though still neutral, the United States recognized that war was likely and the urgent need for additional ships ruled out an entirely new design, so the Clevelands were a close development of the earlier s, the chief difference being the substitution of a two-gun  dual-purpose gun mount for one of the main battery  gun turrets.

The ship was powered by four General Electric steam turbines, each driving one propeller shaft, using steam provided by four oil-fired Babcock & Wilcox boilers. Her crew numbered 1285 officers and enlisted men.

The ship was armed with a main battery of twelve 6 in /47 caliber Mark 16 guns in four 3-gun turrets on the centerline. Two were placed forward in a superfiring pair; the other two turrets were placed aft of the superstructure in another superfiring pair. The secondary battery consisted of twelve  /38 caliber dual-purpose guns mounted in twin turrets. Two of these were placed on the centerline, one directly behind the forward main turrets and the other just forward of the aft turrets. Two more were placed abreast of the conning tower and the other pair on either side of the aft superstructure. Anti-aircraft defense consisted of twenty-eight Bofors  guns in four quadruple and six double mounts and ten Oerlikon  guns in single mounts.

The main battery turrets were protected with  faces and  sides and tops, and they were supported by barbettes 6 inches thick. Portsmouths conning tower had 5-inch sides.

Service history
Portsmouth was laid down at the Newport News Shipbuilding & Dry Dock Company in Newport News, Virginia on 28 June 1943. She was launched on 20 September 1944 and was commissioned on 25 June 1945 with the hull number CL-102. The ship then embarked on her initial shakedown cruise that took Portsmouth as far south as Cuba. She was thereafter based in Norfolk, Virginia; by that time, World War II had ended, precluding any significant wartime service. The ship was assigned to the Operational Development Force, serving with that unit into 1946. Portsmouth embarked on a goodwill cruise to visit various ports in Africa, including Cape Town, South Africa; Lagos, Nigeria; Freetown, Sierra Leone; Monrovia, Liberia; Dakar, French Senegal; and Casablanca, French Morocco. From there, she continued into the Mediterranean Sea to visit Naples and Palermo, Italy. She thereafter returned to the United States.

The ship began another cruise to the Mediterranean on 25 November. She reached Naples on 7 December and then entered the Adriatic Sea, steaming as far north as Trieste by the end of December. She patrolled the area through February 1947, during a period of tension in the region in the aftermath of World War II. In March, she spent two weeks back in Trieste, and in April, she left the Mediterranean for home. A third Mediterranean cruise began in November and concluded with her arrival in Boston on 11 March 1948. She underwent an overhaul there and then took part in routine training operations off the East Coast of the United States. During this period, she also conducted training cruises for United States Navy Reserve personnel to the Caribbean. She sailed to the Philadelphia Naval Shipyard for a final overhaul in preparation of being reduced to the reserve fleet. She was decommissioned on 15 June 1949 and allocated to the Atlantic Reserve Fleet. She remained in the Navy's inventory through 1970. She was stricken from the naval register on 1 December that year and subsequently broken up.

Footnotes

Notes

Citations

References

External links

Cleveland-class cruisers
World War II cruisers of the United States
Ships built in Newport News, Virginia
1944 ships